Tuxentius gabrieli, the Gabriel's Pierrot, is a butterfly in the family Lycaenidae. It is found in Yemen and south-western Saudi Arabia.

References

Butterflies described in 1999
Polyommatini